Parapoynx sinuosa is a moth in the family Crambidae. It was described by Thomas Pennington Lucas in 1892. It is found in Australia.

References

Acentropinae
Moths described in 1892